Betty Osceola (born August 8, 1967) is a Native American Everglades educator, conservationist, anti-fracking and clean water advocate. She is a member of the Miccosukee Tribe of Indians of Florida from the Panther Clan. Osceola was born and raised in the Everglades. She spent her upbringing living off the land, hunting and fishing with her father. She is an airboat captain and the operator of Buffalo Tiger Airboat Tours on Tamiami Trail near Miami, Florida.

Early life
In January 2019, Osceola revealed details about her childhood in an interview for the American ExperienceThe Swamp series produced by PBS, stating that while she was growing up in the Everglades she lived in a chickee hut with four walls but her mother and grandmother had lived in open huts. When Betty was five, she’d go south into the swamp to play. Spend all day there barefoot, running around.  She also shared that her people had once lived off the land planting corn and pumpkin in the islands but these days the waters are so polluted that they are not able to do that anymore.

Prayer Walks

2015-2017: Walk for Mother Earth on U.S. Highway 41 
Osceola along with her uncle Bobby C. Billie (1946-2018) founded the Walk for Mother Earth, a grassroots organization attracting people of other First Nations, Glades people, scientists, environmentalists, and concerned citizens. Billie, a spiritual and clan leader (whose official title was Council of the Original Miccosukee Simanolee Nation Aboriginal Peoples), and Osceola lead an annual multi-day prayer walk along a proposed bike path  to be built on Florida State Route 41 between Naples and Miami.

The project was designated as the River of Grass Greenway (ROGG) project. Osceola and Billie opposed this construction and set out to educate the public and government officials about the negative repercussions this project would bring to the Everglades ecosystem. Eventually, they spoke at public hearings at the Collier County Board of Commissioners' meeting followed by the Miami-Dade County Board of Commissioners which concluded in both counties rescinding the project. After Billie's passing, Osceola continues the prayer walks in South Florida.

2016: Standing Rock - Dakota Access Pipeline 
Osceola made two trips  from the Everglades to the Standing Rock Indian Reservation to deliver supplies to the Dakota Access Pipeline protests.

2019: Prayer Walk around Lake Okeechobee January 26-February 3 
Osceola with Holley Rauen, from Pachamama Alliance, organized and lead a group of six participants during a seven-day long and 118-mile prayer walk to bring attention to the water quality issues. During the entire walk she carried a red bandanna attached to her walking stick to bring attention to the missing and murdered Indigenous women. Rauen lead the online prayer group.

2019: Prayer Walk on Historic Loop Road December 7–8 
Osceola and Reverend Houston R. Cypress from the Otter Clan, organized and lead a group of over 60 participants during a two-day long and 31-mile prayer walk in the historic Loop Road in Ochopee, Florida.

2021: Prayer Walk on U.S. Highway 41 January 2-3 
Osceola and Reverend Houston R. Cypress  organized and lead a group of 41 participants during a two-day long and 36-mile prayer walk on State Road 41, from East to West, in Big Cypress National Preserve in opposition to the EPA State Assumption of Dredge and Fill Permitting under Section 404 of the Clean Water. The group started on East entrance of Loop Road and ended on the second day in Carnestown, Florida.

2021: Prayer Walk around Lake Okeechobee February 6–12 
Osceola and Reverend Houston R. Cypress organized a second walk around the perimeter of Lake Okeechobee, with a group of 26 participants for a seven-day long and 118-mile prayer. In addition to praying for the healing of Mother Earth the walk was in opposition to the EPA State Assumption of Dredge and Fill Permitting under Section 404 of the Clean Water.

2021: Big Cypress Hike and Signs Across the Alley Action 
Osceola organized and lead a group of concerns citizens for a one day hike into Big Cypress National Preserve to educate the public and to protest a proposed oil drilling plan. After the hike protesters lined up on the side of Interstate 75.

Path of the Panther Film (2022)
Documentary, United States, 88 minutes running time. Osceola is featured in this film directed by Eric Bendick and produced by Carlton Ward, Eric Bendick, and Tori Linder. Executive produced by Leonardo DiCaprio. Release date February 24, 2023.

Awards
In January 2018, Osceola received the John V. Kabler Grassroots Organizing Award during the Everglades Coalition annual summit.

References

External links
 Buffalo Tiger Airboat Tours 

1967 births
Activists from Florida
20th-century Native American women
20th-century Native Americans
Women environmentalists
Living people
21st-century Native American women
21st-century Native Americans
Native American activists
Native American environmentalists